Richard Pfeiffer may refer to:

 Richard Friedrich Johannes Pfeiffer (1858–1945), German physician and bacteriologist
 Richard Pfeiffer (politician) (born 1944), member of the Ohio Senate